Spencer Township is one of the nineteen townships of Guernsey County, Ohio, United States. As of the 2010 census the population was 1,071, of whom 704 lived in the unincorporated portion.

Geography
Located in the southwestern corner of the county, it borders the following townships:
Westland Township - north
Jackson Township - northeast
Valley Township - east
Buffalo Township, Noble County - southeast, north of Noble Township
Noble Township, Noble County - southeast, south of Buffalo Township
Brookfield Township, Noble County - south
Meigs Township, Muskingum County - southwest corner
Rich Hill Township, Muskingum County - west

The village of Cumberland is located in southern Spencer Township.

Name and history
Spencer Township was organized in 1819. Statewide, other Spencer Townships are located in Allen, Lucas, and Medina counties and formerly in Hamilton County.

Government
The township is governed by a three-member board of trustees, who are elected in November of odd-numbered years to a four-year term beginning on the following January 1. Two are elected in the year after the presidential election and one is elected in the year before it. There is also an elected township fiscal officer, who serves a four-year term beginning on April 1 of the year after the election, which is held in November of the year before the presidential election. Vacancies in the fiscal officership or on the board of trustees are filled by the remaining trustees.

References

External links
County website

Townships in Guernsey County, Ohio
Townships in Ohio